Sibling Rivalry is the twelfth studio album by American rock band The Doobie Brothers. The album was released on October 3, 2000, by Pyramid Records and Rhino Entertainment.

The album was the band's first studio recording since Brotherhood, in 1991. It was also the only Doobie Brothers studio album to feature a lead vocal by multi-instrumentalist John McFee and full lead vocals by drummer Keith Knudsen, both of whom had rejoined the group in 1993 after an eleven-year absence.

The group photograph in the inner booklet featured touring sidesmen Guy Allison (keyboards, backing vocals), Marc Russo (saxophone) and Skylark (bass, backing vocals). Allison and Russo also featured on the album, the former co-writing three tracks while occasional touring bassist John Cowan also featured and contributed the song Can't Stand to Lose written with Poco's Rusty Young.

Critical reception
The New Rolling Stone Album Guide wrote that the band were "struggling vainly to put their formula to work again ... [Michael] McDonald wisely stayed far away." The Vancouver Sun deemed the album "vintage soft rock, but not an entirely painful experience."

Track listing

Personnel
The Doobie Brothers
Tom Johnston – guitars, vocals
Patrick Simmons – guitars, banjo, vocals
John McFee – guitars, dobro, pedal steel guitar, harmonica, violin, mandolin, vocals
Keith Knudsen – drums, percussion, vocals
Michael Hossack – drums, percussion

Additional personnel
Guy Allison – keyboards, background vocals
Mario Cippolina - bass on 1 & 9
John Cowan - bass on 2
George Hawkins Jr - bass on 5, 10 & 12
Bob Bangerter - acoustic rhythm guitar on 3 & 11
Marc Russo – horn, saxophone
Chris Thompson - backing vocals on 5, 10 & 12
Maxayn Lewis – background vocals on 4 & 9
Yvonne Williams – background vocals on 4 & 9
Bill Champlin - background vocals on 5 & 9
Cris Sommer-Simmons - background vocals on 11
 Lil' Patrick Harley Simmons - background vocals on 11

Production
Producers: Guy Allison, Terry Nelson, The Doobie Brothers
Production coordination: Terry Nelson
Engineers: Guy Allison, John McFee, Lynn Peterson, Dave Russell, Terry Nelson
Assistant engineer: Steve Genewick
Mixing: Steve Genewick, Joe Peccerillo, Elliot Scheiner
Mastering: Ted Jensen
Recorder: Terry Nelson
House sound: Terry Nelson
Arranger: Guy Allison
Creative consultant: Josh Leo
Cover art: Stanley Mouse
Art Director: Michael A. Beck

References

2000 albums
The Doobie Brothers albums